Sebastian Haseney (born August 27, 1978, in Suhl) is a former German nordic combined skier who has competed since 1999. He won two silver medals in the 4 x 5 km team event at the FIS Nordic World Ski Championships (2005, 2007) and finished 8th in the 15 km individual event at the 1999 championships.

Haseney finished 6th in the 15 km individual event at the 2002 Winter Olympics in Salt Lake City. His two individual career victories were in two 7.5 km sprint events at Lake Placid, New York in 1999 and at Val di Fiemme in 2008.

In January 2011 Haseney finished his career.

References

Official website 

1978 births
Living people
People from Suhl
German male Nordic combined skiers
Sportspeople from Thuringia
Nordic combined skiers at the 2002 Winter Olympics
Nordic combined skiers at the 2006 Winter Olympics
Olympic Nordic combined skiers of Germany
FIS Nordic World Ski Championships medalists in Nordic combined
21st-century German people